Telmatobius is a genus of frogs native to the Andean highlands in South America, where they are found in Ecuador, Peru, Bolivia, northwestern Argentina and northern Chile. It is the only genus in the family Telmatobiidae. Some sources recognize Batrachophrynus as a valid genus distinct from Telmatobius.

Ecology and conservation
All Telmatobius species are closely associated with water and most species are semi-aquatic, while a few are entirely aquatic. The genus includes two of the world's largest fully aquatic frogs, the Lake Junin frog (T. macrostomus) and Titicaca water frog (T. culeus), but the remaining are considerably smaller. Telmatobius contains more than 60 species; the vast majority seriously threatened, especially from habitat loss, pollution, diseases (chytridiomycosis and nematode infections), introduced trout, and capture for human consumption.

The three Ecuadorian species have not been seen for years and may already be extinct: T. cirrhacelis last seen in 1981, T. niger in 1994 and T. vellardi in 1987. Similarly, seven of the fifteen species in Bolivia have not been seen for years. However, some might still be rediscovered: the Bolivian T. yuracare had not been seen in the wild in a decade and there was only a single captive male. A few wild individuals were located in 2019, thus ending the captive male's informal status as an endling (last survivor of the species).

Species 
There are currently 63 species recognized in the genus Telmatobius, but the validity of some species is questionable and it is likely that undescribed species remain.

References

External links

BBC News 4/29/05

 
Amphibians of South America
Amphibian genera
Taxa named by Arend Friedrich August Wiegmann